Sergiu is a Romanian-language given name that may refer to:

Sergiu Băhăian
Sergiu Celibidache
Sergiu Dan
Sergiu Floroaia
Sergiu Klainerman
Sergiu Nicolaescu
Sergiu P. Pașca
Sergiu Samarian
Sergiu Suciu

Romanian masculine given names